For Your Love is the first American album by English rock band the Yardbirds.  Released in July 1965, it contains new studio recordings along with previously released singles.  The album features some of the earliest recordings by guitarists Eric Clapton and his replacement Jeff Beck.

The Yardbirds' manager, Giorgio Gomelsky, who selected the songs, planned to capitalise on the group's hit "For Your Love". The album, released as the Yardbirds were preparing for their first American tour, reached number 96 in Billboard's Top LPs chart.  It was unissued in the UK, although the songs with Beck were released in August 1965 on the Five Yardbirds EP.

Recording and composition
For Your Love features three songs from Jeff Beck's first recording sessions with the Yardbirds: "I'm Not Talking", "I Ain't Done Wrong", and "My Girl Sloopy".  Eric Clapton provided the guitar for the remainder of the tracks, that include the three Yardbirds singles (with B-sides) released up to that time and two demos which were not released in the UK until the 1980s (see discography for singles information). 

"I Ain't Done Wrong" was solely credited as a Keith Relf composition, as part of the group's desire to emulate the Beatles and other some other British groups that were doing their own songwriting. In reality, though, "I Ain't Done Wrong" was largely a rewrite of Eddie Kirkland's "I Must Have Done Somebody Wrong", by way of Elmore James' own rewrite, "Done Somebody Wrong".

Clapton, who had left the band four months earlier, is not pictured on the album cover nor mentioned in the liner notes.  Group chronicler Gregg Russo notes, "The cover was somewhat of a joke, as Jeff Beck was humorously seated in front of a keyboard that he did not play on the album."

Charts and reception

The album reached number 96 in Billboards Top LPs chart.  It was the Yardbirds' first charting album; their British debut, Five Live Yardbirds, did not reach the UK Albums Chart and was not issued in the US.

In a retrospective review, AllMusic writer Bruce Eder gave the album three out of five stars, who notes the inconsistency of the Gomelsky-selected material.  He describes the songs with Beck as "hard, loud, blazing showcases... show[ing] where the band was really heading" and although the material with Clapton is "primitive" compared to his later efforts, it "was some of the best blues-based rock & roll of its era [1964]."

Track listing

Original album
Songwriter credits are taken from the original Epic LP.  However, since the running times are not given, those from The Yardbirds Story (2002), produced by Gomelsky, are used instead.

Album reissues
The Yardbirds' 2001 compilation album Ultimate! contains eight of the eleven tracks from the original album.  For Your Love has been reissued by several record labels, including JVC, Castle, and Repertoire. In addition to the eleven tracks from the original album, the Repertoire reissue includes 13 non-album single and demo tracks.

Personnel
The Yardbirds
Keith Relf – lead vocals, harmonica, acoustic guitar on "Heart Full of Soul"
Eric Clapton – lead guitar on all tracks, except those with Beck and "Questa Volta"
Jeff Beck – lead guitar on "I'm Not Talking", "I Ain't Done Wrong", "My Girl Sloopy", "Steeled Blues" and "Paff...Bum"
Chris Dreja – rhythm guitar, lead guitar on "Questa Volta"
Paul Samwell-Smith – bass guitar, backing vocals, musical director
Jim McCarty – drums, backing vocals

Additional musicians
Giorgio Gomelsky – backing vocals on "A Certain Girl"
Brian Auger – harpsichord on "For Your Love"
Denny Pierce – bongos on "For Your Love"
Ron Prentice – bowed bass on "For Your Love", bass on "Heart Full of Soul"
Manfred Mann – keyboard and backing vocals on "Sweet Music"
Paul Jones – backing vocals on "Sweet Music"
Mike Hugg – vibes on "Sweet Music"
Tom McGuinness – guitar on "Sweet Music"
Mike Vickers – guitar on "Sweet Music"
unidentified – sitar on "Heart Full of Soul"
unidentified – tabla on "Heart Full of Soul"
unidentified – keyboards on "Paff...Bum" and "Questa Volta"

Notes

References

Sources

The Yardbirds albums
1965 albums
Albums produced by Giorgio Gomelsky
Epic Records albums
Albums recorded at IBC Studios
Albums recorded at Olympic Sound Studios